Kozyi Ugony is a rural locality in Bolsheugonsky Selsoviet Rural Settlement, Lgovsky District, Kursk Oblast, Russia. Population:

Geography 
The village is located on the Seym River, 46 km from the Russia–Ukraine border, 58 km south-west of Kursk, 8 km south-east of the district center – the town Lgov, 2 km from the selsoviet center – Bolshiye Ugony.

 Climate
Kozyi Ugony has a warm-summer humid continental climate (Dfb in the Köppen climate classification).

Transport 
Kozyi Ugony is located 1.5 km from the road of regional importance  (Kursk – Lgov – Rylsk – border with Ukraine) as part of the European route E38, on the road of intermunicipal significance  (38K-017 – Malyye Ugony – Pogorelovka), 2 km from the nearest railway halt 408 km (railway line Lgov I — Kursk).

The rural locality is situated 65 km from Kursk Vostochny Airport, 135 km from Belgorod International Airport and 267 km from Voronezh Peter the Great Airport.

References

Notes

Sources

Rural localities in Lgovsky District